Senator Pirsch may refer to:

Carol McBride Pirsch (born 1936), Nebraska Legislature, 1979-1997
Pete Pirsch (born 1969), Nebraska Legislature, 2007-2015